Harish Kumar (born 1 August 1975) is an Indian actor and film producer. He has played the lead in films. He is known for his works in Telugu and Hindi movies. His movies include Prem Qaidi, Coolie No. 1, Tirangaa, Prema Khaidi, Kranti Kshetra, Ravan Raaj: A True Story and Daisy. He has won two Nandi Awards.

Career

For the film Andhra Kesari, he won the Nandi Award for the best child Actor of the year 1983 from the Chief Minister Late N. T. Rama Rao. He also received special jury award as the best actor in 1996 for the film Oho Naa Pellanta produced by D.Ramanaidu, and directed by Jandhyala. Harish acted as a lead at a young age of 13. His first film as a lead actor was Daisy, a Malayalam film directed by Pratap Pothen. The movie also starred Kamal Haasan. In Tamil, he was introduced by T. Rajendar as a lead in the film Pookkal Vidum Thoothu, directed by Sreedhar Rajan.

In Telugu, he was introduced as a lead actor by producer D. Ramanaidu in the film Prema Khaidi in 1990 with Malashree as the female lead. As the film went on to be a success at the box office, Ramanaidu decided to re-make it in Hindi with Harish as the lead and introduced Karisma Kapoor as the female lead opposite Harish in the film Prem Qaidi in 1991 which did well at the box office. He acted with many Legendary stars of India like Rajinikanth, Kamal Haasan, Chiranjeevi, Govinda, Mithun Chakraborty, Akkineni Nageswara Rao, Dharmendra, Jeetendra. Throughout his career Harish has acted in a total of 280 movies.

Personal life
Kumar married Sangeeta Chugh in 1995 and lives with his family in Mumbai. The couple has two sons.

Filmography

As a child actor

As an adult actor

Telugu

Hindi

Malayalam

Kannada

Tamil

Awards
Nandi Awards
 1983 - Best Child Actor - Andhra Kesari (1983)
 1996 - Special Jury Award - Oho Naa Pellanta

References

External links

Indian male film actors
Male actors in Telugu cinema
Male actors in Tamil cinema
Male actors in Kannada cinema
Living people
1975 births
Male actors in Malayalam cinema
Male actors in Hindi cinema
Male actors from Hyderabad, India
Indian male child actors
20th-century Indian male actors
21st-century Indian male actors